Matthew O'Neill may refer to:
 Matthew O'Neill, 1st Baron Dungannon (died 1558), Irish aristocrat
 Matthew O'Neill (footballer) (born 1984), English football midfielder
 Matthew O'Neill (filmmaker), American documentary filmmaker and director